Argiope minuta is a species of spider in the family Araneidae. It is found in India, Bangladesh, China, Taiwan, Korea and Japan.

References

External links

minuta
Spiders of Asia
Spiders described in 1879